Shcherbatovka is a rural locality (a selo) in Vodnobuyerachnoye Rural Settlement, Kamyshinsky District, Volgograd Oblast, Russia. The population was 210 as of 2010. There are 6 streets.

Geography 
Shcherbatovka is located on the Volga Upland, 57 km northeast of Kamyshin (the district's administrative centre) by road. Shcherbakovka is the nearest rural locality.

References 

Rural localities in Kamyshinsky District